Daniel Axt (born November 19, 1991) is a German actor. He is known for portraying Nick in Disney's film Rock It!.

Filmography

Film

Television

References

External links

1991 births
Living people
Actors from Hanover
German male film actors
German male voice actors
21st-century German male actors